Grace Fenton Garner (born 19 June 1997) is an English former professional racing cyclist, who rode professionally between 2016 and 2020, for the , ,  and  teams. Her older sister Lucy van der Haar also competed professionally in cycling, before also retiring in 2020.

Career
Garner was educated at Countesthorpe Leysland Community College. In 2015, Garner finished sixth in the Women's Tour de Yorkshire, and seventh in the junior road race at the UCI Road World Championships. She turned professional with the  team in 2016: after the team folded at the end of the season she joined  for the 2017 season. As part of the National Women's Road race series, Garner won the Essex Giro. When  folded at the end of 2018, both Garner sisters joined  for 2019.

Garner retired from cycling at the end of the 2020 season.

See also
 List of 2016 UCI Women's Teams and riders

References

External links
 

1997 births
Living people
English female cyclists
Sportspeople from Leicester